John Weinerhall (born 19 April 1995) is a Swedish politician of the Moderate Party. He has been a member of the Riksdag since 2018.

He began his political career within the Moderate Youth League and was, among other things, district chairman in Östergötland from 2015 to 2018. He is a member of the regional council in the Östergötland region since the 2014 election, where he worked with health and medical issues.

Weinerhall is the second Deputy Chairman of the Moderate Youth League since November 2018.

References 

1995 births
Living people
Members of the Riksdag from the Moderate Party
Members of the Riksdag 2018–2022
People from Finspång Municipality
Members of the Riksdag 2022–2026
21st-century Swedish politicians